The thirteenth season of the American comedy television series It's Always Sunny in Philadelphia premiered on FXX on September 5, 2018. The season consists of 10 episodes and concluded on November 7, 2018.

Cast

Main cast
 Charlie Day as Charlie Kelly
 Glenn Howerton as Dennis Reynolds
 Rob McElhenney as Mac
 Kaitlin Olson as Dee Reynolds
 Danny DeVito as Frank Reynolds

Recurring cast
 Mary Elizabeth Ellis as The Waitress 
 David Hornsby as Cricket 
 Artemis Pebdani as Artemis Dubois 
 Lance Barber as Bill Ponderosa 
 Travis Schuldt as Ben The Soldier
 Sandy Martin as Mrs. Mac 
 Lynne Marie Stewart as Bonnie Kelly 
 Gregory Scott Cummins as Luther Mac
 Michael Naughton as The Waiter
 Andrew Friedman as Jack Kelly
 Mary Lynn Rajskub as Gail the Snail

Guest stars

Production
On April 1, 2016, the series was renewed for a thirteenth and fourteenth season, which tied it with The Adventures of Ozzie and Harriet as the longest-running (in number of seasons) live-action sitcom in American TV history.

In March 2017, following the twelfth season finale in which Glenn Howerton's character was seemingly written off the show, Howerton expressed doubt about his return for the thirteenth season, describing it as "partially a creative and personal decision." He also suggested that the show would take an "extended hiatus" in order to accommodate the cast's other projects. In late April, Kaitlin Olson confirmed Sunnys extended hiatus ahead of the thirteenth season due to the cast's busy schedules. In August 2018, Rob McElhenney confirmed that Howerton is "in pretty much every episode" of the season. Howerton appeared in six of the season's ten episodes, but had no writing credits.

Episodes

Reception
The thirteenth season received positive reviews. On Rotten Tomatoes, it has an approval rating of 94% with an average score of 8/10 based on 18 reviews. The site's critical consensus reads, "It's Always Sunnys winning formula keeps the laughs rolling and the stomachs turning in a thirteenth season that's topical, triumphant, and toxic in the best way." The finale in particular received praise, with many critics lauding the unexpected emotional and artistic depth of Rob McElhenney's performance.

References

External links
 
 

It's Always Sunny in Philadelphia
2018 American television seasons